John Jackson (born January 4, 1965) is a former American football offensive tackle in the National Football League. Best known for his time as a member of the Pittsburgh Steelers, Jackson was drafted out of Eastern Kentucky University. While at EKU, Jackson was a three-year starter and a two-time All-OVC selection under head coach Roy Kidd. While he was at EKU, the Colonels won three OVC titles and he blocked for two of the top five career rushers in EKU history, Elroy Harris and James Crawford.

Jackson spent 14 seasons in the NFL with the Steelers (1988–1997), the San Diego Chargers (1998–1999), and the Cincinnati Bengals (2000–2001). He started in Super Bowl XXX for the Steelers when they went up against the Dallas Cowboys. John Jackson was inducted into the Kentucky Pro Football Hall of Fame in June 2009. Jackson was a dominating force at EKU and the talented offensive tackle had a good relationship with the school’s program after he was drafted. While in the NFL, Jackson contributed to the EKU’s athletic facilities and helped to improve the Moberly and Presnell Buildings on campus.

He was drafted into the NFL as a student. Shortly before being drafted, he met and married Joan Taylor of Cincinnati and the couple had two sons: Joshua (Josh) and Jordan. Josh, a former EKU student like his father, is a competitive long-drive golfer who ranks on the World Long Drive Tour. Jordan is a musical artist known as “Faedaway”. Joan, now Joan Sloan, and John divorced after 20 years of marriage.

Upon retirement from the league, Jackson said: "I'm done. You can stick a fork in me." Jackson had played in 203 games between the Steelers, Chargers and Bengals. "I'm not trying to come back, unless we go play golf somewhere. That's about the only thing I'll play."

References

Further reading

1965 births
Living people
American football offensive tackles
Pittsburgh Steelers players
San Diego Chargers players
Cincinnati Bengals players
Eastern Kentucky Colonels football players
Woodward High School (Cincinnati, Ohio) alumni
Ed Block Courage Award recipients